Imperial College Road is a tree-lined road in South Kensington, London, England. It runs east–west with Queen's Gate to the west and Exhibition Road to the east.

The road forms part of the boundary between Royal Borough of Kensington and Chelsea to the south and the City of Westminster to the north. It lies at the heart of the area known as Albertopolis, with a number of museums, cultural buildings and educational institutions in the area, a legacy of the Great Exhibition of 1851 held in Hyde Park to the north and promoted by Prince Albert, husband of Queen Victoria. Formerly known as Imperial Institute Road, the road now takes its name from Imperial College London, on whose campus it is located. The Queen's Tower (surrounded by the Queen's Lawn adjacent to Imperial College Road) dominates the view to the north halfway along the road, along with the college's Central Library. To the south are the Department of Chemistry of Imperial College, the Sir Alexander Fleming Building, and the Science Museum. Beyond these buildings is the Natural History Museum.

See also
 Imperial College London

References

Streets in the Royal Borough of Kensington and Chelsea
Streets in the City of Westminster
Odonyms referring to a building
Imperial College London
South Kensington